Awaken or Awakened may refer to:

Film and television
 Awakened (film), a 2013 American thriller by Joycelyn Engle and Arno Malarone
 The Awakened, a 2009 film featuring Richard Kiel
 Awoken (film), a 2019 Australian horror film
 Awaken (TV series), a 2020–2021 South Korean drama series
 "Awaken" (12 oz. Mouse), a television episode
 "Awakened" (Charmed), a television episode

Music
 Awaken (band), a Belgian rock band

Albums
 Awaken (The Blood Divine album), 1996
 Awaken (The Empire Shall Fall album) or the title song, 2009
 Awaken (Koncept album) or the title song, 2012
 Awaken (Natalie Grant album) or the title song, 2005
 Awaken (NCT 127 album), 2019
 Awaken (Soulidium album), 2015
 Awaken (mixtape), by Keke Palmer, 2011
 Awaken: The Surrounded Experience, by Michael W. Smith, 2019
 Awakened (album), by As I Lay Dying, 2012
 Awakened, by Vorvaň, 2021

Songs
 "Awaken", by Dethklok from The Dethalbum, 2007
 "Awaken", by Disturbed from Believe, 2002
 "Awaken", by Opshop from You Are Here, 2004
 "Awaken", by Society Burning from Entropy.Lingua, 1996
 "Awaken", by Yes from Going for the One, 1977

Other uses
 Awakened (novel), a 2011 House of Night novel by P.C. Cast and Kristin Cast
 Awakened a 2018 sci-fi/horror thriller novel by James Murray and Darren Wearmouth
 The Awakened, A Fellowship in Christ, an American Christian group
 Sherlock Holmes: The Awakened, a 2006 adventure video game
 Awakened, a fictional character quality in the role-playing games Mage: The Ascension and Mage: The Awakening

See also
 Wakefulness, the state of being conscious
 Awake (disambiguation)
 Awakening (disambiguation)